Penmorfa is the name of two villages in Wales.

One is a small village in the community of Penbryn, Ceredigion, Wales. Penmorfa is represented in the Senedd by Elin Jones (Plaid Cymru) and is part of the Ceredigion constituency in the House of Commons.

The other village is Penmorfa in Gwynedd, located north-west of Porthmadog.

References

External links 

Villages in Ceredigion